Mazaher is an ensemble in which women play a leading role. The musicians of Mazaher, Umm Sameh, Umm Hassan, Nour el Sabah, are among the last remaining Zār (زار) practitioners in Egypt.

Zār is a community healing ritual of drumming and dancing whose tradition is carried on mainly by women (men have the secondary roles) and whose main participants are women.

A featured instrument in the Zār ritual is the tanbūra, a six-string lyre, which, like the Zār practice itself, exists in various forms in an area stretching across East Africa to the Arabian Peninsula. Although this sacred instrument is pictured on the walls of tombs and temples of Pharaonic Egypt, the practice of Zār in ancient Egypt is still a matter of conjecture. Other instruments are the mangour, a leather belt sewn with many goat hooves, and various percussion instruments.

References

External links
Mazaher at Egyptian Center for Culture and Art

Egyptian musical groups